Loricella is a genus of chitons in the family Loricidae. They are marine molluscs.

Taxonomy
Species in the genus include:

 Loricella angasi (H. Adams in H. Adams & Angas, 1864)
 Loricella dellangeloi Sirenko, 2008
 Loricella eernissei Sirenko, 2008
 Loricella oviformis (Nierstrasz, 1905)
 Loricella profundior (Dell, 1956)
 Loricella raceki (Milne, 1963)
 Loricella scissurata (Xu, 1990)
 Loricella vanbellei Sirenko, 2008

References

External links 

Chitons
Chiton genera